Bror Fredrik "Esbjörn" Svensson (16 April 1964 – 14 June 2008) was a Swedish jazz pianist and founder of the jazz group Esbjörn Svensson Trio, commonly known as e.s.t.

Svensson became one of Europe's most successful jazz musicians at the turn of the 21st century before dying, at the age of 44, in a scuba diving accident.

Early life and work
Svensson was introduced to both classical music and jazz very early in life through his mother, a classical pianist, and his father, a jazz enthusiast, and first showed interest in classical music. In his teenage years, he developed an interest in rock music and started a few garage bands with classmates, before going back to classical music and finally making his way towards jazz. At the age of 16, Svensson went to a music college, where he took piano lessons. He later studied at the Royal College of Music, Stockholm, for four years.

In 1990, Svensson established his own jazz combo with his childhood friend Magnus Öström on percussion. Both had made their first appearances on stage as sidemen in the Swedish and Danish jazz scene during the 1980s. In 1993, bassist Dan Berglund joined the duo, and the Esbjörn Svensson Trio was born. The trio released its debut album, When Everyone Has Gone, in 1993, and in the following years established itself in the Nordic jazz scene. Svensson was nominated for Swedish Jazz Musician of the Year in 1995 and 1996.

Rise to prominence and death
The trio's international breakthrough came with their 1999 album From Gagarin’s Point Of View, their first album to be released outside Scandinavia. With the release of their albums Good Morning Susie Soho (2000) and Strange Place for Snow (2002), the trio drew the attention of United States audiences. In 2002, they toured Europe, the U.S. and Japan over 9 months. Their subsequent albums, Seven Days of Falling (2003), Viaticum (2005), and Tuesday Wonderland (2006), were equally well received by critics and resulted in several music industry award nominations as well as making the jazz and pop charts.

e.s.t. was the first European jazz combo to make the front page of the American jazz magazine DownBeat (May 2006 issue). Their last live album, e.s.t. Live in Hamburg, a recording of their fall 2006 concert in Hamburg, Germany, as part of the Tuesday Wonderland Tour, was released in November 2007. Before Svensson's death, the trio had already finished the work for what became their album "Leucocyte", which was posthumously released in September 2008. The music to the album was recorded during a 9-hour jam at 301 studios in Sydney and in 2012 another album was released with music from that same recording entitled 301.  e.s.t.'s last performance took place in Moscow, Russia, at the Tchaikovsky Hall, on 30 May 2008. In addition to his work with e.s.t., Svensson recorded albums with Nils Landgren, Lina Nyberg and Viktoria Tolstoy.

On 14 June 2008, Svensson went missing during a scuba diving session on Ingarö outside Stockholm, Sweden. His diving companions, including an instructor and his then 14-year-old son, eventually found him lying unconscious on the seabed. Having sustained serious injuries, he was rushed to Karolinska University Hospital by helicopter, but could not be saved. He was 44 years old, married and the father of two sons.

Discography

As leader/co-leader
Studio albums
 When Everyone Has Gone (1993) Dragon
 Winter in Venice (1997) Superstudio GUL
 EST plays Monk (1996) Superstudio GUL
 From Gagarin's Point of View (1999) Superstudio GUL
 Good Morning Susie Soho (2000) Superstudio GUL
 Strange Place for Snow (2002) Superstudio GUL
 Seven Days of Falling (2003) Superstudio GUL
 Viaticum (2005) Spamboolimbo
 Tuesday Wonderland (2006, Recorded and mixed by Åke Linton at Bohus Sound Recording Studios, Gothenburg, Sweden, in March 2006)
 Leucocyte (2008, recorded by Åke Linton at Studios 301, Sydney, Australia)
 301 (2012, recorded in January 2007 at Studios 301, Sydney, Australia) ACT

Live albums
 E.S.T. Live '95 (1995, released in Sweden as Mr. & Mrs. Handkerchief) ACT Music + Vision
 Live in Stockholm (2003) DVD, recorded 10 December 2000 – including videos and an interview
 Live in Hamburg (2007, recorded 22 November 2006)
 E.S.T. Live in London (2018, recorded 20 May 2005)

Compilation albums
 Somewhere Else Before (U.S. compilation from From Gagarin's Point of View and Good Morning Susie Soho, 2001)
 Retrospective - The Very Best of E.S.T. (2009)

Compilation with other artists
 Solo Flights (Solo performances by Steve Dobrogosz (3 tracks), Bobo Stenson (2 tracks), Anders Widmark (5 tracks), Esbjörn Svensson (4 tracks). Scandinavian Songs Music Group, 1997)

Solo
 Home.S (posthumous release, ACT Music, 2022)

As sideman
With Lasse Lindgren
 To My Friends (Dragon, 1992)
With Lina Nyberg
 Close (Prophone Records, 1993)
With Nils Landgren
 Swedish Folk Modern (ACT Music, 1998)
 Layers of Light (ACT Music, 2004)

See also

References

External links

 Obituary in The Guardian
 Obituary in The Daily Telegraph
 Photos of Esbjörn Svensson Trio by Luca D'Agostino, 2006
 Photos of Esbjörn Svensson Trio by Emre Boyar, 2005
 

 

1964 births
2008 deaths
Swedish jazz pianists
Royal College of Music, Stockholm alumni
ACT Music artists
20th-century pianists
Underwater diving deaths
Accidental deaths in Sweden
People from Västerås
Esbjörn Svensson Trio members